Shek Sau (born Chan Shek-sau, Bill, 21 November 1947) is a Hong Kong actor working for TVB.  His son Sam Chan also works for TVB as an actor. In 2005, they appeared in a cooking show together for a Father's Day promotion.

Filmography

References

External links
 
 hkcinemagic entry

1947 births
Living people
Hong Kong male film actors
Hong Kong male television actors
TVB actors
20th-century Hong Kong male actors
21st-century Hong Kong male actors
Hong Kong television presenters